Adrien F. Arsenault (April 12, 1889 – June 28, 1941) was a lawyer and political figure on Prince Edward Island. He represented 3rd Prince in the Legislative Assembly from 1922 to 1935 as a Conservative.

Biography
He was born in Egmont Bay, Prince Edward Island, the son of Étienne J. Arsenault and Philomène Pitre, and was educated at the Université Saint-Joseph. He studied law with Albert C. Saunders and practised in the office of MacQuarrie and Arsenault at Summerside. Arsenault was married twice: to Bernice A. MacDonald, the daughter of John Alexander MacDonald, in 1920 and to Ellen MacNeill in 1935. He was first elected to the provincial assembly in a 1922 by-election held after Aubin Edmond Arsenault was named a judge. Arsenault served in the province's Executive Council as a minister without portfolio from 1923 to 1927 and from 1931 to 1935. He died in Summerside at the age of 52.

References 
 Fonds Adrien F. Arsenault, Prince Edward Island Archival Information Network 

Progressive Conservative Party of Prince Edward Island MLAs
1889 births
1941 deaths
People from Prince County, Prince Edward Island